Sint-Denijs-Westrem Airport is a closed civil airport and military airfield, located in Sint-Denijs-Westrem, 3.2 km southwest of Ghent, East Flanders, Belgium.

Overview
The airport is the former official airport of Ghent. It was closed in 1985, and the site redeveloped for Flanders Expo.

History
During World War II, the airport was used by the British Royal Air Force as Advanced Landing Ground B-61 SintDenijs-Westrem.

References
 SintDenijs-Westrem (B-61)
 Johnson, David C. (1988), U.S. Army Air Forces Continental Airfields (ETO), D-Day to V-E Day; Research Division, USAF Historical Research Center, Maxwell AFB, Alabama.

1985 disestablishments in Belgium
Belgian airbases
Defunct airports in Belgium
World War II airfields in Belgium
Airports in East Flanders
Buildings and structures in Ghent